The FBI's Ten Most Wanted Fugitives during the 2000s is a list, maintained for a sixth decade, of the Ten Most Wanted Fugitives of the United States Federal Bureau of Investigation. At any given time, the FBI is actively searching for 12,000 fugitives. During the 2000s, 36 new fugitives were added to the list. By the close of the decade a total of 494 fugitives had been listed on the Top Ten list, of whom 463 have been captured or located.

FBI headlines in the 2000s
The 2000s (decade) started out badly for the FBI's much needed attempts to upgrade technology.  First, the "Trilogy" project went far over the $380 million budget, and behind its three-year schedule. Then, Virtual Case File (VCF) planned for completion in 2003, was officially abandoned in 2005, after more than $100 million spent. A new, more ambitious investigation software project, Sentinel, was introduced in 2005 as a replacement for the failed VCF system.

In 2001, Robert Hanssen, high within the Bureau, was caught selling information to the Russians, and Bureau security practices came into question.

In 2002 the FBI's official top priority became counter-terrorism, followed second by counterintelligence. The USA PATRIOT Act granted the FBI increased monitoring powers.

The 9/11 Commission in 2004 blamed the FBI in part for not pursuing intelligence reports which could have prevented the September 11, 2001 attacks. In consequence, the Bureau came under oversight by the new Director of National Intelligence.

FBI 10 Most Wanted Fugitives to begin the 2000s
The FBI in the past has identified individuals by the sequence number in which each individual has appeared on the list. Some individuals have even appeared twice, and often a sequence number was permanently assigned to an individual suspect who was soon caught, captured, or simply removed, before his or her appearance could be published on the publicly released list. In those cases, the public would see only gaps in the number sequence reported by the FBI. For convenient reference, the wanted suspect's sequence number and date of entry on the FBI list appear below, whenever possible.

The following fugitives made up the top Ten list to begin the 2000s:

FBI Most Wanted Fugitives added during the 2000s
The list of the most wanted fugitives listed during the 2000s fluctuated throughout the decade. As before, spots on the list were occupied by fugitives who had been listed in prior years, and still remained at large. The list includes (in FBI list appearance sequence order):

2000–2003

2004–2009

End of the decade
As the decade closed, the following were still at large as the Ten Most Wanted Fugitives:

FBI directors in the 2000s
Louis J. Freeh (1993–2001)
Thomas J. Pickard (2001)
Robert Mueller (2001–2013)

References

External links
Current FBI Top Ten Most Wanted Fugitives

2000s in the United States